The Enterprise siltsnail, also known as the Enterprise spring snail, scientific name Floridobia monroensis, is a species of very small freshwater snails that have an operculum, aquatic gastropod mollusks in the family Hydrobiidae, the mud snails.

This species is endemic to the United States.  It is named after the settlement of Enterprise, which is or was near Lake Monroe in Volusia County, Florida.

References

Molluscs of the United States
Floridobia
Hydrobiidae
Gastropods described in 1885
Taxonomy articles created by Polbot